Rush Through Time is a compilation album by Rush, released in Europe as a picture disc only in 1979. The compilation contained selections from the band's second, third, fourth, and fifth studio albums (Fly by Night, Caress of Steel, 2112, and A Farewell to Kings). The album was subsequently repackaged as a standard vinyl album with a colour sleeve and updated graphics on the back cover in 1982. (According to Rush drummer Neil Peart, the album was compiled by the German branch of Polygram Records without the band's input.)

Track listing
 "Fly by Night" (Lee, Peart) – 3:21
 "Making Memories" (Lee, Lifeson, Peart) – 2:58
 "Bastille Day" (Lee, Lifeson, Peart) – 4:37
 "Something for Nothing" (Lee, Peart) – 3:59
 "Cinderella Man" (Lee, Lifeson) – 4:21
 "Anthem" (Lee, Lifeson, Peart) – 4:36
 "Overture/Temples of Syrinx" (Lee, Lifeson, Peart, Hugh Syme) – 6:35
 "The Twilight Zone" (Lee, Lifeson, Peart) – 3:17
 "Best I Can" (Lee) – 3:24
 "Closer to the Heart" (Lee, Lifeson, Peart, Peter Talbot) – 2:53
 "In the End" (Lee, Lifeson) – 6:48

Personnel
 Geddy Lee – Bass guitar, vocals
 Alex Lifeson – acoustic and electric guitars
 Neil Peart – drums and percussion
 Hugh Syme - Synthesizer on “Overture”

Track Origins
Tracks 1–2, 6, 9, & 11 from Fly by Night (1975)Track 3 from Caress of Steel (1975)Tracks 4 & 7–8 from 2112 (1976)Tracks 5 & 10 from A Farewell to Kings (1977)

References

External links
Official site
Liner Notes and Artwork
Discogs Release Page
Album Review

 
1979 compilation albums
Rush (band) compilation albums
Mercury Records compilation albums